Columbus Mountain, elevation , is a summit in the Elkhead Mountains of northern Colorado, United States. The mountain is northwest of Steamboat Springs in the Routt National Forest.

See also
Mountain peaks of Colorado
Mountain ranges of Colorado

References

Mountains of Colorado
Mountains of Routt County, Colorado